Francis Marshall Carpenter (July 10, 1834 in New Castle, Westchester County, New York – May 12, 1919 in Mount Kisco, Westchester Co., NY) was an American politician from New York.

Life
He was the son of Zopher Carpenter (died 1883) and Phebe (Marshall) Carpenter. He attended the common schools and Bedford Union Academy. In 1853, he opened a store in Mount Kisco, and engaged in the coal business. Later he also engaged in banking, and was interested in insurance companies.

He entered politics as a Republican, was Supervisor of the Town of New Castle for 32 years; was at times Chairman of the Board of Supervisors of Westchester County; and was County Treasurer from 1897 to 1902.

Carpenter was a member of the New York State Senate from 1904 to 1908, sitting in the 127th, 128th, 129th (all three 22nd D.), 130th and 131st New York State Legislatures (both 23rd D.).

Sources
 Official New York from Cleveland to Hughes by Charles Elliott Fitch (Hurd Publishing Co., New York and Buffalo, 1911, Vol. IV; pg. 365f)
 WESTCHESTER NOT "DRY" in The New York Times on April 1, 1896
 CARPENTER DEFEATS EMMET in The New York Times on November 4, 1903
 EX-Senator Carpenter Dies in The New York Times on May 13, 1919

External links
  Ivory gavel presented to Carpenter in 1872

1834 births
1919 deaths
Republican Party New York (state) state senators
People from Mount Kisco, New York
Town supervisors in New York (state)
19th-century American politicians